I'm a Gambler is an album by the American blues musician Little Milton, released in 1994. It was nominated for a W. C. Handy Award, in the "Soul/Blues Album" category. Little Milton promoted the album by touring the United States, Japan, and Europe.

Production
The album includes covers of songs by Johnny Ace and Percy Mayfield, among others. "Like a Rooster on a Hen" was written by the Memphis songwriting partnership of Ben Shaw and John Ward.

Critical reception

The Commercial Appeal stated: "Backed by his smoking band, Little Milton Campbell takes a good-humored look at the latest Delta blues theme." The Chicago Tribune called the album "as satisfying as his classic 1960s R&B catalog for Chicago's Chess Records." The Advocate thought that "Casino Blues" "eyes heartbreak with a wink and a chuckle," and praised the "brassy, soulful style" of the album's other songs.

AllMusic wrote that "Milton sings with vigor, like he was feeling at the top of his game when he recorded this CD—and no wonder, since the material is quite strong."

Track listing

References

1994 albums